Williamson Page House is a historic home located at Morrisville, Wake County, North Carolina.  It is a two-story, three-bay-wide, frame I-house.  The front section was built about 1838, with a transverse stair hall added about 1876, which connects the front section with a two-story rear ell dated to the mid-19th century.  The front section has a side gable roof and one-story hipped-roof porch with jig sawn spandrels and a flat balustrade.

It was listed on the National Register of Historic Places in 2012.

References 

Houses on the National Register of Historic Places in North Carolina
Houses completed in 1876
Houses in Wake County, North Carolina
National Register of Historic Places in Wake County, North Carolina